The 2014 Newcastle City Council election took place on 22 May 2014 to elect members of Newcastle City Council in England. This was on the same day as other local elections.

The election saw the governing Labour Party gain a net extra seat in the council chambers, gaining the wards of Denton and South Jesmond. An Independent councillor was also elected in Westerhope, with Bill Corbett winning with a 451 majority over the Labour Party.

The Conservatives improved their performance from previous years, coming second in wards where they were previously third. The election also saw UKIP field candidates around the city. The party came second in wards including Byker and Lemington.

Overall Results

Ward by Ward Results

References

2014 English local elections
2014
21st century in Newcastle upon Tyne